Wadia Al-Obaid (Arabic: وديع العبيد; born 29 August 1988) is a football player who plays for Al-Safa as a goalkeeper.

External links
 

Saudi Arabian footballers
1988 births
Living people
Al-Nahda Club (Saudi Arabia) players
Al-Nojoom FC players
Al-Watani Club players
Najran SC players
Khaleej FC players
Al Safa FC players
Saudi First Division League players
Saudi Professional League players
Saudi Second Division players
Association football goalkeepers